Traveler is the eighth studio album by Canadian blues/rock musician Colin James, released in Canada in 2003. The album debuted at #22 on the Canadian Albums Chart.

Track listing 
 "I'm Losing You" (John Lennon) – 5:00
 "Make a Mistake" (Colin James, Craig Northey) – 4:57
 "Skydiving" (Colin James, Craig Northey, Jeff Trott) – 4:16
 "I Know What Love Is" (Colin James, Craig Northey, T. Wilson, C. Cripps) – 3:49
 "Black Eyed Dog" (Nick Drake) – 4:17
 "You and Whose Army" (Colin James, Jeff Trott) – 3:45
 "Sending a Message" (Colin James, Craig Northey) – 3:55
 "Know How to Love You" (Colin James) – 4:11
 "She Can't Do No Wrong" (Colin James, Craig Northey) – 3:47
 "Anywhere Is Home" (Colin James, Craig Northey) – 4:25
 "Rainy Day, Dream Away" (Jimi Hendrix) – 7:51

Personnel 
 Colin James - guitars, vocals
 Craig Northey - guitars, vocals
 Darryl Johnson  - bass
 Dean Butterworth - drums
 Jeff Trott      - guitar, piano, wurlitzer
 Eric Webster    - organ

References

External links 
 Traveler

Colin James albums
2003 albums